Koda, also known as Kora, Kaora, Korali, Korati, Kore, Mudi, or Mudikora, is an endangered Munda language of India and Bangladesh spoken by the Kora. The Kora mainly live in West Bengal, in the districts of Paschim Medinipur and Bankura, with a few in neighbouring Odisha and Jharkhand. In 2005, there were 1,300 speakers in the Rajshahi Division of Bangladesh, though many said that Bengali was their best language. Koda is closely related to the Kol language.

Kim (2010) considers Koda and Kol to be Mundari cluster languages. Koda-speaking villages include Kundang and Krishnupur in Rajshahi Division, Bangladesh, while Kol villages include Babudaing village.

Koda verbs are inflected for tense-aspect-mood and person, number, finite/infinite, subject/object, possessor, animacy and transitivity. In recent times Koda is code-mixing with Bangla: including vocabulary replacement and greater adoption of Bengali syntax. These processes are seen more in younger speakers.

Shamim (2021)  presents a description of the phonology and morphology of Koda. It also presents a study of Koda in the context of language contact.

References

Munda languages
Endangered languages of India

Languages of Bangladesh